St Peter and St Paul's Church, Aldeburgh is a Grade II* listed parish church in the Church of England in Aldeburgh, Suffolk.

History
The church tower dates from the 14th century, but much of the rest is 16th century, including the nave, north aisle and north chapel of 1525–1529; the south aisle and chapel 1534–1535; the south porch of 1539 and the chancel 1545. It was restored between 1870 and 1871 by Henry Perkin and again in 1891 by EF Bishop.

Bells
The church has a ring of 8 bells with all but the 6th bell being cast by John Taylor & Co at their Loughborough foundry in 1960 and 1961 as part of the restoration and augmentation of the ring. The restored bells were rededicated on 18 June 1961. Previously there were six bells which were rehung by George Day of Eye in 1885 with 4th bell recast and treble added by John Warner & Sons to make six. The bells hang in an iroko wooden frame installed at the same time as the bells were overhauled in the 1960s.

Peals lasting around 3 hours are rung on the bells most months by members of the Suffolk Guild of Ringers and in 2008 a complaint was lodged with Suffolk Coastal council by a neighbour. The complaint was not upheld and dismissed during a debate in the House of Commons.

Memorials
There is a memorial by Thomas Thurlow to George Crabbe the poet (d. 1832) and a monument to Lady Henrietta Vernon, d.1786. The church is most famous as being the burial place of the composer Benjamin Britten and his partner the tenor Peter Pears; also buried in the churchyard are the pioneering doctor Elizabeth Garrett Anderson, the soprano Joan Cross and the composer and conductor Imogen Holst. Britten is also commemorated in a stained glass window by John Piper and Patrick Reyntiens. The church also houses a memorial to Newson Garrett and his wife, the parents of Elizabeth Garrett Anderson.

Organ
The church has a two manual pipe organ by J. W. Walker & Sons Ltd dating from 1884. A specification of the organ can be found on the National Pipe Organ Register.

References

Church of England church buildings in Suffolk
Grade II* listed churches in Suffolk
Aldeburgh